Seng Khasi College, established in 1973, is a general degree college situated in Shillong, Meghalaya. This college is affiliated with the North Eastern Hill University. This college offers bachelor's degree in arts.

References

Universities and colleges in Meghalaya
Colleges affiliated to North-Eastern Hill University
Educational institutions established in 1973
1973 establishments in Meghalaya